Banmankhi Assembly constituency  is an assembly constituency in Purnia district in the Indian state of Bihar. It is reserved for scheduled castes.

Overview
As per Delimitation of Parliamentary and Assembly constituencies Order, 2008, No. 59 Banmankhi Assembly constituency (SC) is composed of the following: Banmankhi community development block; Aurahi, Barhara Kothi, Dibara Dhani, Gouripur, Latraha, Mulkiya, Nipania, Rustampur, Sukhsena East, Sukhsena West and Matihani gram panchayats of Barhara Kothi CD Block.

Banmankhi Assembly constituency is part of No 12 Purnia (Lok Sabha constituency).

Members of Legislative Assembly

Election results

2020

References

External links
 

Assembly constituencies of Bihar
Politics of Purnia district